Platnum are a British bassline vocal group from Manchester, England, consisting of male vocalist Aaron Evers and female vocalists Mina Poli and Michelle McKenna. The trio are best known for providing the vocals on H "Two" O's 2008 single, "What's It Gonna Be?", which reached number two in the UK Singles Chart in February 2008. Platnum, who formed around 2004, have worked with DJs Jamie Duggan and Q as well as producers Virgo, H "Two" O and Nastee Boi.

The group's highly anticipated second single, "Love Shy (Thinking About You)" was released on 29 September 2008; they then started work on their debut album which became a mixtape and also toured, supporting N-Dubz, in the UK in Autumn 2009.

Formation and early success
The group formed for a local talent show. The selected name for the new band was Urban Superstars, in around 2004. They did not win the competition; they then used their entry track "Over the Heartache" to showcase their talents to established members of the UK bassline scene. The track proved popular, and a remix, by DJ Jamie Duggan, was awarded Bassline Heaven's 'Tune of the Year Award' in 2006. Damien Thompson (a.k.a. D-Tox) engineered and co-produced the track, but was not credited, as he was signed to the Reflective record label at the time.
Nocturnal Records released the track on vinyl, in the same year. The track also had major interest from Ministry of Sound, with the prospect of a major release, but an agreement could not be made between the singers and producers as to whose name would be credited first in the title. The group have met many other singers and producers such as Sacha and S.U.D.

2004 and onwards
Teaming up with the Black Eyed Peas producer DJ Poet, the Mancunian trio Aaron Evers, Michelle McKenna and Mina Poli grew through the UK bassline scene in 2012. Having already created an album called Lost in the Music, the group released the first song, "Solar System", on 6 May 2012 via All In Recordings.

Previously when Michelle was a solo rapper and Aaron and Mina a duo, the three formed at a talent contest in Manchester at a young age. The song that they chose to sing in the final, "Over the Heartache", went on to become one of the most played bassline tracks of all time, combining a love song with a heavy bass. The group toured nationwide with N-Dubz and entering the UK Singles Chart with "What's It Gonna Be" (featuring H “Two” O) in early 2008.

After a coincidental meeting, Michelle was able to hand will.i.am, front man of the Black Eyed Peas, a demo of their work. In the not so glamorous setting of her car, she then played another to producer DJ Poet, and the deal was sealed.

"Solar System" fuses a mix of universal dance with a house beat, being compared to the likes of the Black Eyed Peas, not unexpectedly, and Far East Movement. “I haven't heard a sound or seen a group as original and exciting since the Peas” says DJ Poet himself, and Platnum will be heading onto our radio airwaves within the next few months.

Discography

Singles

References

External links 
 Platnum's Myspace page
 Platnum Interview @ Mobo

UK garage groups
Bassline musicians
Musical groups from Manchester
Musical groups established in 2004
British musical trios
English electronic music groups